Burrangong is a closed railway station on the Blayney–Demondrille railway line in southwestern New South Wales, Australia.

The station opened with the opening of the line between Young and Cowra. A passenger platform was provided with a timber waiting shed opening in 1891. A good siding initially provided was converted into a loop in 1891, which was converted back to a siding in 1899. The siding was abolished in 1938, and the waiting shed removed in 1964. The station closed in 1971 and little trace remains.

References

Regional railway stations in New South Wales
Railway stations closed in 1971
Blayney–Demondrille railway line